Wizz may refer to:

Wizz Air, a Hungarian low-cost airline
Wizz Air Bulgaria, a subsidiary
Wizz Air Abu Dhabi, a subsidiary
Wizz Air UK, a subsidiary
Wizz Air Ukraine, a subsidiary
WIZZ, an American radio station in Massachusetts

See also
Wizz Jones, a British musician
Wizz Fizz, an Australian sherbert brand
WHIZ (disambiguation)
Wiz (disambiguation)
Wizzard